Luis David Cangá Sánchez (born 18 June 1995) is an Ecuadorian footballer who plays as a central defender for Aucas.

Club career
Born in Guayaquil, Cangá joined LDU Quito's youth setup in June 2009, just days shy of his 14th birthday. Promoted to the main squad for the 2014 season, he made his first team debut on 25 January of that year, starting in a 0–1 Serie A away loss against Manta.

Cangá was a regular starter in his first senior campaign, and scored his first goal on 19 November 2014 by netting the opener in a 2–1 away win over Deportivo Cuenca. After a change in the club's tactics, he subsequently became a backup option, and was demoted to the reserve team in August 2017 due to indiscipline problems.

Delfín
On 22 December 2017, Cangá signed a three-year contract with fellow top tier side Delfín. An immediate first-choice, he scored his first goal for the club on 2 March 2019, in a 4–2 home success over Aucas.

International career
Cangá represented Ecuador at under-17 and under-20 levels, playing in the 2011 FIFA U-17 World Cup with the former and the 2015 South American Youth Football Championship with the latter. On 27 August 2014, he was called up to the full side by manager Sixto Vizuete for two friendlies against Bolivia and Brazil, after Jorge Guagua was injured.

Cangá made his full international debut on 6 September 2014, starting in a 4–0 win over Bolivia at the Lockhart Stadium in Fort Lauderdale, Florida.

Career statistics

Club

International

References

1995 births
Living people
Ecuadorian footballers
Association football defenders
Ecuadorian Serie A players
Campeonato Brasileiro Série B players
L.D.U. Quito footballers
Delfín S.C. footballers
CR Vasco da Gama players
2015 South American Youth Football Championship players
Ecuador youth international footballers
Ecuador international footballers